Indiana Academy also known as IA is a Seventh-day Adventist secondary school located in Cicero, Indiana, United States.  Indiana Academy is owned and operated by the Indiana Conference of Seventh day Adventists and is one of many other Adventist secondary educational institutions.  It is a part of the Seventh-day Adventist education system, the world's second largest Christian school system. The average class size is twenty-five students and the school has a graduation rate of 95%.

History 
The school first opened in Boggstown, IN on October 29, 1902, as Boggstown Manual Training Academy.  In 1904, the school moved to Beechwood, IN and was renamed Beechwood Academy.  The school moved to it present location in Cicero, IN in 1921 and adopted the name Indiana Academy. The site provided for a school farm and nearby access to a railroad. The school's first administration building, constructed in 1923, was destroyed by fire in 1995. Its gymnasium was built in 1952.

Curriculum
The school's main curriculum consists of the standard courses taught at college preparatory schools around the world. All students must take courses in the core areas of English, Basic Sciences, Mathematics, Foreign Language, and Social Sciences. The school also offers courses in Religion, Physics, US History, and Personal Finance.

Spiritual aspects
All students annually take religion courses that cover biblical history and Christian and denominational teachings. Instructors in all courses typically begin each class with prayer or an inspirational thought and sometimes encourage student participation. The school has a daily chapel service and sponsors year-round spiritual programs that involve students.

Accreditation
Indiana Academy is accredited by Middle States Association of Colleges and Schools Commission on Secondary Schools (MSCSS).  IA is also accredited by the Board of Regents of the General Conference of Seventh-day Adventists, and the National Council for Private School Accreditation.

See also

List of Seventh-day Adventist secondary schools
 Seventh-day Adventist education

References

External links

Adventist secondary schools in the United States
Educational institutions established in 1902
Education in Hamilton County, Indiana
1902 establishments in Indiana